Touch (Hangul: 터치; shortened from The Original Undeniable Charismatic Homme) is a South Korean boy band formed by YYJ Entertainment in Seoul, South Korea. The group currently consists of five members: Chulmin, Sungyong, Jaewook, Sunwoong and Sangwook. They debuted on October 22, 2010, with the single "Me". Their fans are called "Touchables".

Members

Current
 Chulmin (Hangul: 철민)
 Sungyong (성용)
 Jaewook (재욱)
 Sunwoong (선웅)
 Sangwook (상욱)

Former
 Hanjun (한준)
 Younghun (영훈)
 Minseok (민석)
 Junyoung (준용)
 Dabin (다빈)
 Kanghyun (강현)

Timeline

Discography

Extended plays

Singles

References

External links
 Touch Official on YouTube

Musical groups established in 2010
South Korean dance music groups
K-pop music groups
South Korean boy bands
South Korean pop music groups
Musical groups from Seoul
2010 establishments in South Korea
Musical quartets